The 2016 Sun Devils football team represented Arizona State University in the 2016 NCAA Division I FBS football season. They were led by fifth-year head coach Todd Graham and played their home games at Sun Devil Stadium. They were a member of the South Division of the Pac-12 Conference. They started the season 5-1, and needed to win one more game to become bowl eligible. However, they lost each of their last six games and did not qualify to play in a bowl game. The low point came in their season finale against in-state rival Arizona. With bowl eligibility on the line, the Sun Devils gave up 511 rushing yards in their 56-35 loss. They finished the season 5–7, 2–7 in Pac-12 play to finish in a tie for fourth place in the South Division.

Schedule

Source:

Personnel

Rankings

Game summaries

Northern Arizona

Texas Tech

at UTSA

California

at USC

UCLA

at Colorado

Washington State

at Oregon

Utah

at Washington

at Arizona

References

Arizona State
Arizona State Sun Devils football seasons
Arizona State Sun Devils football